Shankley Mountain is a mountain in the Central New York region of New York. It is located northwest of Cherry Valley, New York.

References

Mountains of Otsego County, New York
Mountains of New York (state)